The Dutch Eerste Divisie in the 1960–61 season was contested by 36 teams, divided in two groups. FC Volendam and Blauw-Wit Amsterdam won the championship.

New entrants and group changes

Group A
Promoted from the 1959–60 Tweede Divisie:
 HFC EDO
 Enschedese Boys
Relegated from the 1959–60 Eredivisie:
 FC Volendam
Entered from the B-group:
 AGOVV Apeldoorn
 DFC
 Helmondia '55
 Hermes DVS
 Leeuwarden
 Limburgia
 RBC Roosendaal

Group B
Promoted from the 1959–60 Tweede Divisie:
 Be Quick 1887
 EBOH
 SC Heerenveen
Relegated from the 1959–60 Eredivisie:
 Blauw-Wit Amsterdam
 Sittardia
Entered from the A-group:
 Excelsior
 't Gooi
 VV Helmond
 SVV
 FC Wageningen

Final tables

Group A

Group B

Eredivisie/Eerste Divisie play-offs

Promotion play-off

DHC moved to Eerste Divisie A next season.

Promotion/relegation play-off

De Volewijckers were promoted to the Eredivisie.

Eerste Divisie/Tweede Divisie play-offs

Relegation play-off

VV Helmond moved to Eerste Divisie A next season.

Promotion/relegation play-off

HFC EDO were relegated to the Tweede Divisie.

See also
 1960–61 Eredivisie
 1960–61 Tweede Divisie

References
Netherlands - List of final tables (RSSSF)

Eerste Divisie seasons
2
Neth